Celene may refer to :

 geography :
 the Spanish Galician town of Caldas de Reis, Ancient Aquae Celenae, notably as Latin titular bishopric
 the Ancient Phrygian town of Celaenae (Latin; Greek Κελαιναί, Kelainái), now in Anatolia (Asian Turkey)
 the Faerie Kingdom of Celene in the fictitious world of Greyhawk
 an alternate spelling of Selene (various senses)